Pembroke is a settlement in inland Taranaki, in the western North Island of New Zealand. It is located about 5 km northwest of Stratford.

Demographics

Pembroke had a population of 1,542 at the 2018 New Zealand census, an increase of 81 people (5.5%) since the 2013 census, and an increase of 117 people (8.2%) since the 2006 census. There were 564 households, comprising 792 males and 753 females, giving a sex ratio of 1.05 males per female. The median age was 38.6 years (compared with 37.4 years nationally), with 321 people (20.8%) aged under 15 years, 312 (20.2%) aged 15 to 29, 717 (46.5%) aged 30 to 64, and 192 (12.5%) aged 65 or older.

Ethnicities were 94.7% European/Pākehā, 10.3% Māori, 1.2% Pacific peoples, 1.0% Asian, and 2.5% other ethnicities. People may identify with more than one ethnicity.

The percentage of people born overseas was 7.6, compared with 27.1% nationally.

Although some people chose not to answer the census's question about religious affiliation, 52.1% had no religion, 35.6% were Christian and 0.8% had other religions.

Of those at least 15 years old, 105 (8.6%) people had a bachelor's or higher degree, and 306 (25.1%) people had no formal qualifications. The median income was $34,200, compared with $31,800 nationally. 177 people (14.5%) earned over $70,000 compared to 17.2% nationally. The employment status of those at least 15 was that 708 (58.0%) people were employed full-time, 204 (16.7%) were part-time, and 33 (2.7%) were unemployed.

Education
Pembroke School is a coeducational full primary (years 1–8) school with a roll of  students as of  The school opened in 1893.

Notes

External links
 Pembroke School website

Stratford District, New Zealand
Populated places in Taranaki